Sylvain Frécon (born 1972 in Bourges) is a French colorist and cartoonist.

References

French comics artists
French cartoonists
Artists from Bourges
1972 births
Living people
Date of birth missing (living people)